Amblyopone is a genus of 10 species of ants, found in Australia, New Caledonia, New Guinea and New Zealand. Ants of this genus possess the gamergate, meaning workers are able to reproduce within a colony lacking a queen.

Species
Amblyopone aberrans Wheeler, 1927
Amblyopone australis Erichson, 1842
Amblyopone clarki Wheeler, 1927
Amblyopone ferruginea Smith, 1858
Amblyopone gingivalis Brown, 1960
Amblyopone hackeri Wheeler, 1927
Amblyopone leae Wheeler, 1927
Amblyopone longidens Forel, 1910
Amblyopone mercovichi Brown, 1960
Amblyopone michaelseni Forel, 1907

References

External links

Amblyoponinae
Ant genera